The 1968 Pacific typhoon season has no official bounds; it ran year-round in 1968, but most tropical cyclones tend to form in the northwestern Pacific Ocean between June and December. These dates conventionally delimit the period of each year when most tropical cyclones form in the northwestern Pacific Ocean.

The scope of this article is limited to the Pacific Ocean, north of the equator and west of the International Date Line. Storms that form east of the date line and north of the equator are called hurricanes; see 1968 Pacific hurricane season. Tropical Storms formed in the entire west pacific basin were assigned a name by the Joint Typhoon Warning Center. Tropical depressions in this basin have the "W" suffix added to their number. Tropical depressions that enter or form in the Philippine area of responsibility are assigned a name by the Philippine Weather Bureau, the predecessor of the Philippine Atmospheric, Geophysical and Astronomical Services Administration (PAGASA). This can often result in the same storm having two names.

Systems 

31 tropical depressions formed this year in the Western Pacific, of which 27 became tropical storms. 20 storms reached typhoon intensity, of which 4 reached super typhoon strength. No storms this season caused significant damage or deaths.

CMA Tropical Depression 01 

A tropical depression formed to the northwest of Palau. Moving north-northwest, the depression degenerated to a remnant low as it made a counterclockwise direction before dissipating.

This depression was not recognized by the JMA, but the CMA.

Tropical Depression 01W (Asiang)

Typhoon Jean

Typhoon Kim (Biring)

Tropical Depression 04W

Tropical Depression 05W

Typhoon Lucy (Konsing)

Typhoon Mary

Severe Tropical Storm Nadine (Didang)

Tropical Storm Olive (Edeng)

CMA Tropical Depression 11

CMA Tropical Depression 12

CMA Tropical Depression 13

Severe Tropical Storm Polly 

Tropical Storm Polly dropped heavy rains on the southern islands of Japan. 112 people were killed and 21 were missing from the floods and landslides caused by Polly's heavy rains.

On August 18, two sightseeing buses were involved in the landslide in Shirakawa, Gifu, it fell to the Hida River, and 95 persons died and 9 persons became missing.

Tropical Depression 11W

Severe Tropical Storm Rose (Gloring)

CMA Tropical Depression 16

Typhoon Shirley (Huaning)

Severe Tropical Storm Trix (Iniang) 

Severe Tropical Storm Trix struck the southern islands of Kyūshū and Shikoku. Heavy flooding killed 25 people and left 2 missing.

CMA Tropical Depression 18

Severe Tropical Storm Virginia 

It later became extratropical on August 27 in the Gulf of Alaska.

Typhoon Wendy (Lusing) 

Tropical Storm Wendy, which formed on August 28 in the open Western Pacific, quickly intensified to a peak of 160 mph winds on the 31st. It steadily weakened as it moved westward, and passed by southern Taiwan on September 5 as a minimal typhoon. Wendy continued to weaken, and after crossing the South China Sea, Wendy dissipated over northern Vietnam on the 9th.

Typhoon Agnes 

Typhoon which did not approach land closely. The typhoon was one of two Category 5 cyclones to be named Agnes, the other one being in 1952.

Typhoon Bess

CMA Tropical Depression 24

Typhoon Carmen

Typhoon Della (Maring) 

Typhoon Della struck Kyūshū Island in southern Japan with winds of 100 mph. Della killed 11 throughout southern Japan.

Typhoon Elaine (Nitang) 

Super Typhoon Elaine, after peaking at 175 mph winds, weakened to hit extreme northern Luzon on September 28 as a 130 mph typhoon. It continued to the northwest, and after hitting southeastern China as a minimal tropical storm Elaine dissipated on October 1.

Typhoon Faye

Typhoon Gloria (Osang)

CMA Tropical Depression 29

Severe Tropical Storm Hester

Typhoon Irma

Typhoon Judy (Paring)

Typhoon Kit

Typhoon Lola

Typhoon Mamie (Reming)

Typhoon Nina (Seniang)

Typhoon Ora (Toyang) 

A typhoon that made landfall in the Philippines as a category 1 and impacted most of the northern Philippines as a tropical storm.

Storm names 
Western North Pacific tropical cyclones were named by the Joint Typhoon Warning Center. The first storm of 1968 was named Jean and the final one was named Ora.

Philippines 

The Philippine Weather Bureau (later renamed to the Philippine Atmospheric, Geophysical and Astronomical Services Administration in 1972) uses its own naming scheme for tropical cyclones in their area of responsibility. PAGASA assigns names to tropical depressions that form within their area of responsibility and any tropical cyclone that might move into their area of responsibility. Should the list of names for a given year prove to be insufficient, names are taken from an auxiliary list, the first 6 of which are published each year before the season starts. Names not retired from this list will be used again in the 1972 season. This is the same list used for the 1964 season, except for Didang and Iniang, which replaced Dading and Isang; the latter would later be reintroduced in 1972 for reasons still unknown. The Philippine Weather Bureau and its successor PAGASA uses its own naming scheme that starts in the Filipino alphabet, with names of Filipino female names ending with "ng" (A, B, K, D, etc.).

See also 
 Australian cyclone seasons: 1967–68, 1968–69
 South Pacific cyclone seasons: 1967–68, 1968–69
 South-West Indian Ocean cyclone seasons: 1967–68, 1968–69

References

External links 
 Japan Meteorological Agency
 Joint Typhoon Warning Center .
 China Meteorological Agency
 National Weather Service Guam
 Hong Kong Observatory
 Macau Meteorological Geophysical Services
 Korea Meteorological Agency
 Philippine Atmospheric, Geophysical and Astronomical Services Administration
 Taiwan Central Weather Bureau
 Digital Typhoon - Typhoon Images and Information
 Typhoon2000 Philippine typhoon website